Luis Ramon Rivera Rivera (born September 4, 1986 in Humacao) is a Puerto Rican gymnast. Rivera had won a total of three medals at the 2007 Pan American Games in Rio de Janeiro, Brazil, including two golds for the team all-around and pommel horse. He competed at the 2008 Summer Olympics in Beijing, where he finished fourteenth in the men's individual all-around final, with a total technical score of 90.175. He is also affiliated with Federacion Puertorriqueña de Gimnasia (Puerto Rican Federation of Gymnastics), and is coached and trained by Jose and Juan R. Colon.

Career achievements
 Fourteenth place in the individual all-around event at the 2008 Summer Olympics in Beijing, China
 Three-time medalist (two golds and one bronze) at the 2007 Pan American Games in Rio de Janeiro, Brazil
 Finished fourth for vault at the 2008 Turnier der Meister in Cottbus, Germany, and at the 2011 ART World Cup Series in Paris, France
 Bronze medalist in men's vault at the 2008 Doha Artistic Gymnastics World Cup

References

External links
 
 
 
 Luis Rivera Rivera at NBC 2008 Olympics website

1986 births
Living people
Puerto Rican male artistic gymnasts
Gymnasts at the 2008 Summer Olympics
Olympic gymnasts of Puerto Rico
People from Humacao, Puerto Rico
Gymnasts at the 2007 Pan American Games
Gymnasts at the 2011 Pan American Games
Pan American Games gold medalists for Puerto Rico
Pan American Games silver medalists for Puerto Rico
Pan American Games bronze medalists for Puerto Rico
Pan American Games medalists in gymnastics
Medalists at the 2011 Pan American Games